The Wulili are an Indigenous Australian people of the state of Queensland.

Language
Wulili is regarded as a dialect of Wagawaga. Nils Holmer has analysed what little has been salvaged from the language.

Country
Dawson River. he placed their eastern borders in the vicinity of Eidsvold.

History
Camboon Station was a major employer of people from the Wulli Wulli first nation. State Library of Queensland holds the Camboon Station records which record the day to day activities or running the pastoral station including details of the Wulli Wulli peopled employed as drovers and stockmen, shepherds, general station hands and domestic servants.

A very late tradition collected in 1979 states that a certain Jimmy Reid, A Camboon station resident, told a third party before his own death, that the Wulili had participated in the Hornet Bank massacre. In her memoir, the Queensland poet Judith Wright affirmed that, together with the Yiman, who were held responsible for the killings of the Fraser family, the Wulili also were wiped out. John Mathew, however, managed to collect samples of their language from native informants decades later, and published the results in 1926.

Alternative names
 Wilili.
 Wililililee.
 Willillee.
 Wuli-wuli.

Notes

Citations

Sources

Aboriginal peoples of Queensland